WNTE (89.5 FM) is a radio station licensed to Mansfield, Pennsylvania, United States, serving the Mansfield University campus.  The station is currently owned by WNTE-FM-Mansfield University. The station operates at 150 watts and reaches a 15-mile radius from the central location.The On-Air Studio, dubbed "The Fishbowl", was dedicated in April 2008 and is located in the center of the Alumni Hall student lounge.  The On-Air studio also doubles as the current Production Studio.WNTE runs DJSoft RadioBoss automation program when there is not a live DJ present in the studio.WNTE is also known for its DJ Services and Live Sound Services to the Mansfield University campus and surrounding community, as well as much of Tioga County, Pennsylvania.

References

External links

NTE
NTE